Jamie Gross (born September 2, 1983 in Wynnewood, Pennsylvania) is an American film editor.  Gross started her career as an assistant editor on the Oscar-nominated documentary Murderball. She worked as an editor on the Comedy Central show Michael & Michael Have Issues and the IFC sketch comedy show The Whitest Kids U' Know.  Gross worked as an assistant editor on the David Wain directed films, Role Models and The Ten. In 2010, she edited the Saturday Night Live sketch-based film MacGruber.

Television
 Whose Wedding Is It Anyway? - 2003 (editor)
 True Life - 2006 / 2007 (assistant editor/editor)
 Miami Ink - 2006 (assistant editor)
 Kathy Griffin: My Life on the D-List - 2006 (additional editor)
 Wainy Days - 2007 - 2009 (editor)
 Childrens Hospital - 2008 (editor)
 The Whitest Kids U' Know - 2009 (associate editor)
 Michael & Michael Have Issues - 2009 (editor)
 She-Hulk: Attorney at Law - 2022 (editor)

Filmography
 Murderball - 2005 (assistant editor)
 The Savages - 2007 (post-production intern)
 The Ten - 2007 (assistant editor)
 Role Models - 2008 (assistant editor)
 This Is Not a Robbery - 2008 (editor)
 MacGruber - 2010 (editor)
 Hot Tub Time Machine 2 - (2015) (editor)
 Vacation - (2015) (editor)
 Popstar: Never Stop Never Stopping - (2016) (editor)
 A Futile and Stupid Gesture (2018) (editor)
 Game Night (2018) (editor)
 Booksmart (2019) (editor)

References

External links

1983 births
American film editors
People from Pennsylvania
Living people